Colonia-Haus is a 45-storey,  skyscraper completed in 1973 in the Riehl district of Cologne, Germany. Upon completion in 1973, it was the tallest residential-only building in Europe until the 2001 completion of the KölnTurm.

Technology and equipment 
The tower is equipped with four-speed elevators each for up to 18 people, garbage chutes on all floors, partial air-conditioning in the apartments and additional heating. They are joined by a parking garage, several bicycle storage rooms with washing machines, tumble dryers and mangles.

The pool on the ground floor overlooking the Rhine measures 8 meters x 15 meters. In addition, there is a separate children's pool. The house also has a Finnish sauna with plunge pool and relaxation room, a fitness room and table tennis facilities.

A   grocery store, a restaurant with a terrace overlooking the Rhine, and a bar and bowling alleys, a doctor's office and a municipal kindergarten are all on the ground floor.

Appearance 
The skyscraper was known by its advertising slogan of Colonia, with the insurance group, the Cologne Colonia recruited who was acquired in 1997 by the AXA Group. Accordingly, it was replaced in 1998 the advertising slogan at the highest point of the house by AXA, with the name of the house remained unchanged.

See also 
List of tallest buildings in Germany

References

Buildings and structures in Cologne
Residential buildings completed in 1973
Skyscrapers in Cologne
Residential skyscrapers in Germany
Nippes, Cologne
Apartment buildings in Germany